Yevgeni Nikolayevich Sakharov (born 22 July 1988) is a former Russian professional football player.

Club career
He played in the Russian Football National League for FC Tekstilshchik Ivanovo in 2007.

External links
 Career summary at Sportbox
 

1988 births
Living people
Russian footballers
Association football midfielders
FC Tekstilshchik Ivanovo players
FC Spartak Kostroma players
FC Olimp-Dolgoprudny players